In finance, the clean price is the price of a bond excluding any interest accrued since bond's issuance and the most recent coupon payment. Comparatively, the dirty price is the price of a bond including the accrued interest. Therefore,

In Bloomberg Terminal or Reuters, bond prices are quoted using the clean price. Traders tend to think of bonds in terms of their clean prices.

Clean prices are more stable over time than dirty prices. When clean prices change, it is for an economic reason such as a change in interest rates or the bond issuer's credit quality.  Dirty prices change day to day depending on the date relative to the coupon payment dates, as well as economic reasons.

Example 

Price example:

XYZ Ltd. issues a bond with a $1000 face value and a $980 published price, with a coupon rate of 5% paid semi-annually and a maturity date of five years. The annual coupon payment is 5% of $1000, or $50. The investor receives a $25 coupon payment every six months until the maturity date. 

In this case, $980 is the clean price of the bond. The bond price quoted to investors is $980 plus the accrued interest. Brokers quote the dirty price, found by adding the clean price and accrued interest since that day. 

If the bond's last coupon payment was made on 1 June, on 1 September, the dirty price is: Clean Price + Accrued Interest (where accrued interest is the interest accumulated from 1 June to 31 August on the bond according to its coupon rate.) 

The price changes continuously, as it depends on how many days have passed since the last coupon payment on the bond.

See also 
 Accrued Interest
 Bond
 Dirty Price

References

Further reading 
Calculation of the clean price of a bond in a cash management bond repurchase operation, Bank of Canada. Retrieved 2015-11-10.

External links 
Clean price By Investopedia
Calculate clean and dirty price of a bond by Financetrain

Bond valuation
Fixed income analysis